The Western Army Division (3. förd), was a division of the Swedish Army that operated in various forms from 1941 to 1997. Its staff was located in Skövde Garrison in Skövde.

Heraldry and traditions

Coat of arms
The coat of arms of the Western Army Division used from 1994 to 1997. Blazon: "Azure, a double-tailed lion rampant or, armed and langued gules. The shield surmounted two batons, charged with open crowns azure in saltire or".

Medals
In 1997, the Västra arméfördelningens (3.förd) minnesmedalj ("Western Army Division (3.förd) Commemorative Merit") in silver (VFördSMM) of the 8th size was established. The medal ribbon is of green moiré with white edges followed by a blue stripe.

Commanding officers

1941–1981: ?
1981–1991: Senior colonel Leif Kesselmark
1991–1993: Senior colonel Per Källström
1993–1996: Senior colonel Johan Hederstedt
1995–2000: Senior colonel Sven-Eric Andersson

Names, designations and locations

See also
Division

Footnotes

References

Notes

Print

Divisions of Sweden
Military units and formations established in 1941
Military units and formations disestablished in 1997
1941 establishments in Sweden
1997 disestablishments in Sweden
Disbanded units and formations of Sweden
Skövde Garrison